Joseph Upatham School, sometimes called "Joseph Upatham School Samphran" and abbreviated as JS), is a private Catholic school in Nakhon Pathom, Thailand under the Education Department of the Archdiocese of Bangkok. Managed by the Archbishop and Pastor of the Archdiocese of Bangkok, the Sisters of the Sacred Heart of Jesus and the Sisters of Saint Paul of Chartres. 

 Founder: Archbishop Joseph Khiamsun Nittayo
 Co-Founder: Rev. Francis Xavier Thongdee Kitcharaen
 Licensee: Cardinal Michael Michai Kitbunchu

The sub district of Tha Kham (usually written Takham), is the heartland of the Roman Catholic Christian religion in Thailand. Michael Michai Kitbunchu, Cardinal of Thailand was born in Sam Phran and many Catholic religious institutes have their convents, monasteries and headquarters in the area and there is also Thailand's major seminary. The largest and most important installation in the Catholic enclave of Tha Kham, (and also in Sam Phran), is the vast campus shared by Joseph Upatham School one of the largest combined kindergarten, primary and secondary schools in the country, the main institution of the 43 schools and colleges governed by the Education Department of Bangkok Archdiocese (EDBA), and the Ban Phu Waan Pastoral Training Centre - a leading Catholic conference and convention centre in Asia. There are several other large private schools in Takham including St. Peter's school (mixed gender, kindergarten and Grades 1 to 9) also governed by the EDBA in the parish of St. Peter, a village and factory community about 2 kilometres from the main highway in the south of Tha Kham, and Marie Upatham, an independent Catholic school for girls in the Takham village of Mor Sii.

Name 
"Joseph" is the name of the patron saint of Archbishop Joseph Khiamsun Nittayo and "Upatham" in the Thai Language means foster. When combined, "Joseph Upatham" means "was fostered by St. Joseph".

Relations with the Holy See 
 1987: Pope John Paul II presided the celebration of a Mass for Thanksgiving with 23 new priests' concelebrating with him at the closing of the sacred year for Thailand at Joseph Upatham School.
 2004: Pope Benedict XVI sent a congratulatory plaque to Joseph Upatham School on the occasion of the school's 40th anniversary.

Notable alumni 
Cardinal Francis Xavier Kriengsak Kovitvanit, Bishop of Nakhon Sawan (7 March 2007 – 14 May 2009) and Archbishop of Bangkok (14 May 2009–present)
Bishop Francis Xavier Vira Arpondratana, Bishop of Chiang Mai (10 February 2009 – present)

Rector of Joseph Upatham School 
Saint Joseph Seminary

The Ascension Catholic Church

Manager of Joseph Upatham School 
School's Directors

Headmaster of School's College

Headmistress of School's Convent

Curriculum

Primary Education (Grade 1-6 according to Thai Education)
1.Intensive English Course
2.English Programme
3.Ordinary Programme
Junior High School Education (Grade 7-9 according to Thai Education)
1.Intensive English Course
2.English Programme
3.Ordinary Programme
4.Science-Mathematics Programme
Senior High School Education (Grade 10-12 according to Thai Education)

Memorandum of Understanding 
1.since 2001
  Hawthorn-Melbourne English Language Centre, University of Melbourne (Australia)
2.since 2015
  Chinese Language and Culture School of Kunming, China and Chinaviz Language Institute (Bangkok Division)
  Goodwill Chinese Culture Communication Co., Ltd.
3.since 2017
  Stamford International University (Thailand)

Catholic schools in Thailand
Educational institutions established in 1965
1965 establishments in Thailand
Schools in Nakhon Pathom Province